"If It Means a Lot to You" is a song by the American rock band A Day to Remember featuring American singer Sierra Kay (credited as Sierra Kusterbeck on the release). Produced by Chad Gilbert and A Day to Remember, it was featured as the closing track on the band's 2009 studio album, Homesick.

Composition and lyric
Written by lead vocalist, Jeremy McKinnon, "If It Means a Lot to You” is a song about leaving behind a special person, swearing you will be back soon and often but, as time goes on, coming home is not as simple as one thought it would be. The song narrates McKinnon's experience while he is away touring and can't return to his loved one.

Promotion and release
The song was originally only released as part of the album in February 2009, and was not a single. However, after gaining overwhelming popularity among fans, it was re-released as a radio airplay single over five years later on September 29, 2014. It was included in the Rock Band video game in downloadable mode. In 2019, it surpassed 100 million plays on Spotify, making it the most listened to song by the band on that platform.

Personnel
All credits adapted by Genius.

A Day to Remember
 Jeremy McKinnon — lead vocals, acoustic guitar, producer, engineering
 Tom Denney — lead and acoustic guitar, backing vocals
 Neil Westfall — rhythm guitar, backing vocals
 Joshua Woodard — bass

Additional personnel
 Sierra Kusterbeck — guest vocals
 Josh Freese — drums
 Chad Gilbert — production, recording, programming
 Dave Guynn — harmonica

Certifications

References

A Day to Remember songs
2009 songs
Song recordings produced by Chad Gilbert
Song recordings produced by Jeremy McKinnon
Songs written by Jeremy McKinnon
Songs written by Tom Denney
Victory Records singles